Tobias Lindström (born 20 April 1988) is a Swedish-Norwegian professional ice hockey player who is currently playing for Vålerenga Ishockey in Fjordkraftligaen. He was born in Stockholm and formerly represented Sweden on junior level national teams, before switching to the Norwegian national team in 2018.

Lindström was selected to compete at the 2018 World Championships as a member of the Norway men's national ice hockey team.

References

External links
 

1988 births
Living people
Bofors IK players
Djurgårdens IF Hockey players
Lørenskog IK players
Norwegian ice hockey players
Swedish ice hockey centres
Ice hockey people from Stockholm
Vålerenga Ishockey players